The Central Post Office in Kyiv, Ukraine, is located in Maidan Nezalezhnosti. It houses Ukrposhta, Ukraine's national postal service, and includes offices and a 24-hour internet café on the upper floors. The building was completed in 1958, and underwent a renovation during the 1990s.

History 

Construction for a new post office began in 1914, was halted by World War I, and was eventually completed in 1941. The current building was built between 1952 and 1958.

On 2 August 1989, during heavy rainfall, the portico of the building collapsed, killing 13 people.  At the time of the collapse, the building had been undergoing reconstruction.

During the 2022 Russian invasion of Ukraine, although many Ukrposhta employees either moved to safer areas in Western Ukraine or left the country entirely, the post office remained operational.  Ukrposhta also released a number of popular stamps, highlighting events such as the sinking of the Moskva and the liberation of Kherson, leading people to queue up for hours outside the post office.

Building 

The seven-story brick building has concrete floors and a tin roof. The wing located along Khreshchatyk has a slight curvature. The façade includes Ukrainian Baroque elements. The building used to have a parapet, but it does no longer. White marble tiles were added to the central hall during a renovation in the 1990s. On the first floor, the frames for the doors and windows are made of dark granite.

Gallery

Notes

References 

Buildings and structures completed in 1958
Buildings and structures in Kyiv
Maidan Nezalezhnosti
Post office buildings